The Great Falls Americans were a junior ice hockey team based in Great Falls, Montana playing in the American Frontier Hockey League and the America West Hockey League from 1995 to 2003. They played at the Four Seasons Arena.  The team won the league championship in 2000-2001. Notable players during the 2000-2001 AWHL hockey season include Pat Dwyer, Bobby Robins, Jon Volp, and David Printz. During this successful season, under the coaching of Swedish born Rikard Grönborg, the Americans won the AWHL championship, beating the Billings Bulls for the trophy.

Season-by-season record
Season statistics 
Note: GP = Games played, W = Wins, L = Losses, T = Ties Pts = Points,GF = Goals for, GA = Goals against

References

Defunct ice hockey teams in the United States
Ice hockey clubs established in 1995
1995 establishments in Montana
2003 disestablishments in Montana
Ice hockey clubs disestablished in 2003
Sports in Great Falls, Montana